Summer & Summer is a 2007 Taiwanese television series starring Joe Cheng, Wu Xiong and Ethan Juan. It was based on the Japanese josei manga, written by Yachi Emiko. It was produced by Comic Productions and directed by Wang Mingtai.

The series was first broadcast in Taiwan on the free-to-air Chinese Television System (CTS) from 11 March to 27 May 2007, every Sunday at 21:30 and on cable TV Gala Television (GTV Variety Show) from 17 March to 6 June 2007, every Saturday at 21:00. The first episode on CTS achieved an average rating of 1.30 and peaked at 2.68.

Synopsis
Xia Ya chooses a hair salon that is a dollar cheaper than the others, leading to many unfortunate events. When her handbag is stolen along with all her money, she does not even have one dollar to call her parents for help. However, when she feels like all hope is lost, a male dressed like an angel gives her the dollar she needs. She falls in love with him immediately.

At school the next day, she becomes best friends with a new student, Ouyang Yu Yan. When Xia Ya sees Yu Yan talking to the angel, she discovers that he is actually her brother, Ouyang Lei, a model. He was having a photo shoot when he gave the dollar to Xia Ya.

Being the youngest of the family as well as a famous model, Lei is very spoiled and everyone lets him have his way. When Xia Ya yells at him for not looking at any of the love letters he has, he begins to develop an interest in her.

Because Xia Ya is willing to help others unconditionally, Lei begins to like her more and more.

Cast
 Joe Cheng as Ouyang Lei 
 Tsai Yi-chen as Xia Ya 
 Ethan Juan as Zhou Qiao Shan 
 Zhang Yu Chen as Ouyang Yu Yan
 Sandrine Pinna as Tina 
 Alien Huang as Chen Lang Zhu
 Danson Tang as Tian Guang Zhen 
 Shin as Sean
 Scott as Kali 
 Deng Jiu Yun (鄧九雲) as Mao Xiang Ling
 Chen Wei Min (陳為民) as Jiang An Nu 
 Lee Lee-zen as Gui Long Shi
 Guo Ching Chun as Ouyang's mother
 Xia Jin Ting (夏靖庭) as Xia's father 
 Chen You Fang (陳幼芳) as Xia's mother
 Hu Huan Wei (胡桓瑋) as Xia Jie 
 Ceng Zi Jian (曾子鑑) as Da Pang
 Wu Zhen Ya (吳震雅) as Xiao Pang 
 Cai Ming Xun (蔡明勳) as Juan Mao 
 Chen Zhen Wei (陳振偉)
 Chen Xiang Ling (陳香伶) as Pei Cen 
 Huang Tai An (ep02)
 Zhang Bo Han (章柏翰) as Xia Ya's cousin
 Ma Shi Li (馬世莉) as Cai Jie 
 Adriene Lin as Ah Yue

Soundtrack

Summer & Summer Original Soundtrack (熱情仲夏 電視原聲帶) was released on 27 March 2007 by Avex Taiwan with songs by Xiao Yu, Shin, Mon, Joe Cheng, Wu Xiong and Tsai Han-tsen. It contains thirteen songs, of which eight are various instrumental versions. The opening theme song is "你要什麼就說" ("Just Say What You Want") by Xiao Yu (小宇), while the ending theme song is "Lei Le" or "Tired" by Shin.

Track listing

Books
 23 April 2007: Summer & Summer Photobook (熱情仲夏幕後紀實) - 
 15 March 2007: Summer & Summer TV Drama Novel (熱情仲夏電視小說) -

Promotion
 On 17 February 2007, members of the cast appeared in a Chinese New Year television special along with the cast of Hanazakarino Kimitachihe and members of the Taiwanese band Fahrenheit. The show was a competition with a new year theme.

References

External links
  GTV Summer & Summer official homepage
  CTS Summer & Summer official homepage

Chinese Television System original programming
Gala Television original programming
2007 Taiwanese television series debuts
2007 Taiwanese television series endings
Taiwanese television dramas based on manga